

Cambodian League 
 Phnom Penh Crown
 Boeung Ket
 National Defense Ministry
 Preah Khan Reach
 Angkor Tiger
 National Police Commissary
 Naga World
 Center Main Action
 Western Phnom Penh
 Visakha
 Asia Euro University
 Electric De Cambodge
 Svay Rieng
 Siem Reap
 Soltilo Angkor
 Build Bright United

Cambodian Lower Levels 
 Intry Bopear
 Prek Pra Keila
 Kompong Champ
 Kandal Province
 Riel Phnom Penh
 Koh Kong
 Khla Rokhen Kompong Chnang
 Kang Reach Sey
 Kampong Thom
 National Assembly
 Oddar Meanchey
 RKC National
 University Of Cambodia
 Nokorbal Cheat
 Ministry Of Commerce
 Royal Dolphins
 Body Guard Club
 Civil Aviation
 Ministry Of Transport
 ISI Group United

External links
 RSSSF

 
Cambodia
Football clubs
Football clubs